Katrín Jónsdóttir (born 31 May 1977) is an Icelandic former footballer who played as a defender. She was captain of Iceland's national team from 2007 to 2013 and competed at the 2009 and 2013 editions of the UEFA Women's Championship.

Club career
Achievements across her career include being a ten time Úrvalsdeild kvenna champion, six time Icelandic Women's Football Cup winner, eight time Icelandic Women's Football Super Cup winner and Toppserien champion in 2002 and 2003. During her time in Norway playing for Kolbotn, she finished her medical studies and became a practising physician.

Katrín left Damallsvenskan club Djurgårdens IF in January 2013. She signed a one-year contract with Umeå IK.

International career
In May 1994, Katrín made her senior Iceland debut in a 4–1 friendly win over Scotland.

At UEFA Women's Euro 2009, Katrín played in all three matches as Iceland were eliminated in the first round following defeats by France, Norway and Germany.

National team coach Siggi Eyjólfsson selected Katrín in the Iceland squad for UEFA Women's Euro 2013, where she played in the three group matches and the 4–0 quarter-final defeat to hosts Sweden.

Personal life
Katrín's husband Þorvaldur is a former professional footballer who played for the Iceland national football team. They were married in August 2009, just before Katrín played at UEFA Women's Euro 2009.

Honours

Individual
 Icelandic Women's Footballer of the Year: 1998
 Úrvalsdeild Player of the Year: 2009
 Athlete of Reykjavík: 2008.
 Most promising football player of the year in Iceland: 1997

References

External links

1977 births
Living people
Katrin Jonsdottir
Katrin Jonsdottir
Katrin Jonsdottir
Expatriate women's footballers in Norway
FIFA Century Club
Djurgårdens IF Fotboll (women) players
Damallsvenskan players
Katrin Jonsdottir
Umeå IK players
Toppserien players
Katrin Jonsdottir
Katrin Jonsdottir
Women's association football defenders
Katrin Jonsdottir
Iceland women's international footballers